Ernest Denis (January 3, 1849 – January 4, 1921) was a French historian. Denis became known as a specialist of Germany and Bohemia, and played a major role in the establishment of the Czechoslovak state in 1918. Along with Louis Léger, he is considered to be one of the most highly regarded 20th-century historians of the Slav world in France. 

In 1916, Thomas Garrique Masaryk and Edvard Beneš founded the Comité national tchèque in Paris, and almost at the same time Louis Eisenmann, Louis Léger, and Ernest Denis founded the Comité national d'études , which also advocated for the independence of a Czech state. In 1918, the French government created Czechoslovak legions. On 28 October 1918, the Republic of Czechoslovakia was proclaimed in Prague. 

Upon the death of Denis, the Czechoslovak state bought his house in Paris in order to create an institute for Slavic studies.

Notes

20th-century French historians
French politicians
1849 births
1921 deaths
French male non-fiction writers
Historians of the Czech lands
19th-century French historians